Peter Fitzpatrick (born 11 May 1962) is an Irish Independent politician who has been a Teachta Dála (TD) for the Louth constituency since the 2011 general election.

He was a former soldier in the 27 Infantry Battalion and also a former manager of the Louth county football team.

Sporting career
A member of Clan Na Gael GAA club in Dundalk, Fitzpatrick won a Leinster Under-21 championship medal with Louth in 1981.

Fitzpatrick was appointed the manager of Louth in November 2009, succeeding Eamonn McEneaney, the former Monaghan footballer and manager. His first season in charge of Louth proved to be historic as the team reached their first Leinster final in 50 years. The 2010 Leinster Senior Football Championship Final pitted them against Meath. Louth almost won but for referee Martin Sludden, who allowed a controversial goal by Joe Sheridan late in the game. Louth subsequently entered the 2010 All-Ireland Senior Football Championship through the "back door". However, the team lost heavily to Dublin in their next game, thus ending the county's 2010 championship season.

In the 2011 season, Louth qualified for the Division 3 Final where they faced Westmeath. Louth won on a scoreline of 1-15 to 0-13.

He quit in 2012 after 3 years.

He went on to become the chairman of the Louth County Board, and was in this role when Mickey Harte was appointed Louth manager in 2020, also with the successful application for planning for a new stadium for Louth GAA.

Political career
Fitzpatrick allowed his name to go forward for a nomination for Fine Gael ahead of the 2011 general election. He was elected as a Fine Gael TD for Louth. In Dáil Éireann, he sat on the Committee for Transport, Tourism and Sport, and previously on the Health committee.

He opposed the legalisation of abortion in Ireland, calling for a "No" vote in the 2018 abortion referendum. In August 2018, he announced that he would not contest the next general election for Fine Gael. In October 2018, he announced he would seek re-election as an independent and resigned from Fine Gael.

Fitzpatrick was elected as an independent candidate for Louth at the 2020 general election. He is the first Independent to be elected for the constituency since James Coburn (later of Fine Gael) at the 1932 general election.

References

 

1962 births
Living people
Chairmen of county boards of the Gaelic Athletic Association
Fine Gael TDs
Gaelic football managers
Independent TDs
Military personnel from County Louth
Irish sportsperson-politicians
Louth County Board administrators
Louth inter-county Gaelic footballers
Members of the 31st Dáil
Members of the 32nd Dáil
Members of the 33rd Dáil
Politicians from County Louth